December 6, the Historic Durgapur Liberation Day. On this day in 1971, the Damal boys of Bengal, in collaboration with the Indian Allies, liberated Durgapur on the border of Netrokona in a bloody battle.

History 
During the war of liberation a strong Pakistan army base was established at Birishiri in the missionary area of Durgapur under the leadership of Major Sultan of the Pakistani aggressor forces. Sitting here, the Pakistan army, with the help of Bengali brokers, al-badrs and razakars, controlled the Durgapur Sadar, the border areas of Kalmakanda, Lengura, Nazirpur and Vijaypur in Durgapur. At the same time, people were killed in the slaughterhouse of Birishiri in the dark of night.

Martyr 
Among those killed first were Durgapur Krishan College principal Arj Ali, former headmaster Ashutosh Sanyal, MKCM Pilot Government High School headmaster Abdul Awal, Durgapur MNA Purakandulia Union resident Gouranga Chandra Saha, Kullagarh Union chairman. Ali Hossain is significant.

Freedom Fighters 
Durgapur Upazila Freedom Fighter Commander Ruhul Amin Chunnu said that on May 4, 1971, two Pakistani soldiers went to Gaokandia village and tried to rape a woman, but the villagers led by Chhotuni hacked them to death. Due to this, on 5 May, a group of Pakistan army from Birishiri Cantonment went to Gaokandia village and killed 19 villagers including common people by entering a house and shooting and burning them. Besides, Dildar Hossain, a student of Susang Degree College, Imam Hossain, a farmer, Billal Hossain and many others were killed.

He further said that Santosh Biswas, a heroic freedom fighter commander, was shot dead by Pakistanis while coming forward after killing 10 Pakistani soldiers in a brushfire of the Mukti Bahini near Vijaypur. Shaheed Santosh Park was built in Durgapur Sadar after his name. Sudhir Hajong and Abdul Jabbar were two more martyrs in the war of liberation at Durgapur.

Liberation War Memorial Sculpture 
Liberation War Memorial Sculpture (Bengali: মুক্তিযুদ্ধের স্মৃতি ভাস্কর্য) is a sculpture made by Mahmudul Hasan Shohag in 2010. It is (15 feet) high and is located in Durgapur.

The sculpture tribute to Bangladeshi Freedom Fighters who sacrificed their lives during the Liberation War.

References 

Bangladesh Liberation War
events in Bangladesh
December observances